Malis is a surname. Notable people with the surname include:

Alexandros Malis (born 1997), Greek footballer
Claire Malis (1943–2012), American actress
Cy Malis (1907–1971), American baseball player
David Malis (1957), American operatic baritone

See also
Malis (region), an area of Greece occupied by the Malians
Malis (restaurant), a Cambodian restaurant